"Bang Bang" is a song by British singer Rita Ora and Kazakh DJ Imanbek. It was released on 12 February 2021 as a promotional single from their collaborative EP, Bang (2021). The song samples the 1984 composition "Axel F" by Harold Faltermeyer.

Performances 
On 14 February 2021, Ora performed "Bang Bang" on series thirteen of ITV's Dancing on Ice. She later performed the song live at the Sydney Opera House for The Tonight Show Starring Jimmy Fallon on 3 March 2021 and a day later on Australian breakfast show Sunrise. In its third week on 11 March 2021, following a high-energy set at Sydney Gay and Lesbian Mardi Gras, "Bang Bang" was the biggest mover on Australian radio. 

On 18 March 2021, Ora performed at the Nova Red Room, including a slower version of "Bang Bang", which was described by the station as "a hauntingly beautiful version". On 29 August 2021, a prerecorded performance by Ora of "Bang Bang" aired on The Voice (Australian season 10).

Charts

Weekly charts

Monthly charts

Year-end charts

References

2021 songs
Imanbek songs
Rita Ora songs
Songs written by Harold Faltermeyer
Songs written by Rita Ora